Callochiton crocinus is a species of chiton or "sea cradle" in the family Callochitonidae. It occurs on the shores of the Australia-New Zealand region. Locally, it is known as "smooth chiton", but that name is elsewhere applied to other species.

It is a rather colorful member of its class, yellowish- to reddish-brown with white spots; its scientific name means "saffron-colored beautiful chiton".

Synonyms

This chiton has a somewhat convoluted taxonomic history, being described no less than four times as supposedly new species. Tom Iredale believed the individual variation found in C. crocinus represented no less than three different species – actually, these were not even subspecies but merely chance variants –, while Arthur Adams, unaware that the animal had already been validly described shortly before he did, established a name that was a junior homonym. The invalid names of the present species are thus:
 Callochiton platessa Suter, 1913
 Chiton crocinus Reeve, 1847
 Chiton versicolor A. Adams, 1852 (non G.B.Sowerby II, 1839: preoccupied)
 Levicoplax platessa (Suter, 1913)
 Paricoplax crocina (Reeve, 1847)
 Paricoplax perscrutanda Iredale & Hull, 1929

References
 Powell, A.W.B. (1979): New Zealand Mollusca, William Collins Publishers Ltd, Auckland, New Zealand. 

Callochitonidae
Chitons of New Zealand
Chitons described in 1847